The Fugitive is an American action drama television series that aired on CBS from October 6, 2000, to May 25, 2001. The series featured Tim Daly as Kimble, Mykelti Williamson as Gerard, and Stephen Lang as the one-armed man. It acts as a remake of the 1960s TV series of the same name created by Roy Huggins.

Plot
Dr. Richard Kimble (Tim Daly) was wrongly convicted for the murder of his wife. He escapes from custody and changes his identity and toils at many jobs to search for a one-armed man (Stephen Lang) he saw leave the scene of the crime. He is relentlessly pursued by Lieutenant Gerard (Mykelti Williamson) obsessed with his capture.

Cast

Main
 Tim Daly as Dr. Richard Kimble
 Mykelti Williamson as Lt. Philip Gerard

Recurring
 Stephen Lang as Ben Charnquist
 Kelly Rutherford as Helen Ross-Kimble
 Connie Britton as Maggie Kimble Hume
 Lia Johnson as Lenore Gerard
 Rex Linn as Karl Vasick
 John Aylward as Matthew Ross
 Janet Gunn as Becca Ross
 Bob Morrisey as Captain McLaren
 Lauren Tewes as Linda Westershulte

Production

Development
The long lasting success of the original series of The Fugitive (1963-1967) combined with the huge success of the 1993 film version led to the development of this series. The influence of the movie is evident, particularly in some scenes of the pilot episode. The series was produced by Arnold Kopelson and Warner Bros., the producers of the 1993 film.

The pilot was directed by Mikael Salomon, and cost an estimated $6 million to film. According to Tim Daly, there were 3,500 affiliates at the CBS Affiliates Dinner in Las Vegas in 2000, they were shown the entire pilot of The Fugitive, and it got a seven-minute standing ovation.

Daly had to drop his part as Superman in the DC Animated Universe to get his role, surrendering the Man of Steel to Christopher McDonald in Batman Beyond, and George Newbern in Justice League.

Filming
It was filmed in various places, including Seattle, Washington.

Connections to the original series
Each episode of the new series includes a credit "Created by Roy Huggins". Tim Daly's father James Daly made two guest appearances on the original series. Writer Arthur Weiss is credited with one episode of the new series and three of the old series. Lou Antonio, who appeared as an actor in three episodes of the original series, directed an episode of the new series. William Graham directed two episodes of the new series, and seven of the old series.

Cancellation
CBS cancelled the series after one season, leaving a cliffhanger unresolved.

Episodes

Broadcast
The show was the first lead-in to CSI: Crime Scene Investigation on Friday nights, which became a hit when it debuted the same year.

Reruns of the series have previously aired on HDNet and AOL's streaming service, In2TV.

Reception

Awards

See also
 The Fugitive (1993 film)
 The Fugitive (2020 TV series)

References

External links

Homepage of The Hunted: Unofficial Fugitive Site

American action adventure television series
2000s American crime drama television series
2000s American mystery television series
CBS original programming
2000 American television series debuts
2001 American television series endings
English-language television shows
Wrongful convictions in fiction
Television series by Warner Bros. Television Studios
Television series reboots
The Fugitive (TV series)
Television series created by Roy Huggins